Aoshita No.2 Dam  is a gravity dam located in Miyagi Prefecture in Japan. The dam is used for water supply. The catchment area of the dam is 19.8 km2. The dam impounds about 4  ha of land when full and can store 212 thousand cubic meters of water. The construction of the dam was started on 1931 and completed in 1933.

See also
List of dams in Japan

References

Dams in Miyagi Prefecture